"Somebody's Love" is a song by English singer-songwriter Passenger. The song was released as a digital download on 17 June 2016 in the United Kingdom, as the lead single from his seventh studio album, Young as the Morning, Old as the Sea (2016).

Music video
A music video to accompany the release of "Somebody's Love" was first released onto YouTube on 16 June 2016 at a total length of three minutes and fifty-one seconds.

Track listing

Chart performance

Weekly charts

Release history

References

2016 singles
2016 songs
Passenger (singer) songs